Bright Star is a 2009 biographical romantic drama film, written and directed by Jane Campion. It is based on the last three years of the life of poet John Keats (played by Ben Whishaw) and his romantic relationship with Fanny Brawne (Abbie Cornish). Campion's screenplay was inspired by a 1997 biography of Keats by Andrew Motion, who served as a script consultant.

Bright Star was in the main competition at the 2009 Cannes Film Festival, and was first shown to the public on 15 May 2009. The film's title is a reference to a sonnet by Keats titled "Bright star, would I were steadfast as thou art", which he wrote while he was with Brawne.

Plot
In 1818 Hampstead, the fashionable Fanny Brawne is introduced to poet John Keats through the Dilke family.  The Dilkes occupy one half of a double house, with Charles Brown occupying the other half. Brown is Keats' friend, roommate, and associate in writing.

Fanny's flirtatious personality contrasts with Keats' notably more aloof nature. She begins to pursue him after her siblings Samuel and Toots obtain his book of poetry, "Endymion". Her efforts to interact with the poet are fruitless until he witnesses her grief for the loss of his brother, Tom. Keats begins to open up to her advances while spending Christmas with the Brawne family. He begins giving her poetry lessons, and it becomes apparent that their attraction is mutual. Fanny is nevertheless troubled by his reluctance to pursue her, on which her mother surmises, "Mr. Keats knows he cannot like you, he has no living and no income."

It is only after Fanny receives a valentine from Brown that Keats passionately confronts them and asks if they are lovers. Brown sent the valentine in jest, but warns Keats that Fanny is a mere flirt playing a game. Fanny is hurt by Brown's accusations and Keats' lack of faith in her; she ends their lessons and leaves. The Dilkes move to Westminster in the spring, leaving the Brawne family their half of the house and six months rent. Fanny and Keats then resume their interaction and fall deeply in love. The relationship comes to an abrupt end when Brown departs with Keats for his summer holiday, where Keats may earn some money. Fanny is heartbroken, though she is comforted by Keats' love letters. When the men return in the autumn, Fanny's mother voices her concern that Fanny's attachment to the poet will hinder her from being courted. Fanny and Keats secretly become engaged.

Keats contracts tuberculosis the following winter. He spends several weeks recovering until spring. His friends collect funds so that he may spend the following winter in Italy, where the climate is warmer. After Brown impregnates a maid and is unable to accompany him, Keats finds accommodation in London for the summer, and is later taken in by the Brawne family following an attack of his illness. When his book sells with moderate success, Fanny's mother gives him her blessing to marry Fanny once he returns from Italy. The night before he leaves, he and Fanny say their tearful goodbyes in privacy. Keats dies in Italy the following February of complications from his illness, as his brother Tom did.

In the last moments of the film, Fanny cuts her hair in an act of mourning, dons black attire, and walks the snowy paths that Keats had walked many times. It is there that she recites the love sonnet that he had written for her, called "Bright Star", as she grieves the death of her lover.

Cast
 Ben Whishaw as John Keats.Keats was one of the key figures in the second generation of the Romantic movement despite the fact that his work had been in publication for only four years before his death. During his lifetime his poems were not generally well received by critics and at age 25 he died believing he was a failure. However, his reputation grew and he held significant posthumous influence on many later poets.
 Abbie Cornish as Fanny Brawne.Like the real life Fanny Brawne, Fanny in the film is a fiery and fashionable eighteen-year-old who spends her time creating dresses, hats, and various other garments. She is also something of a flirt and enjoys attending balls, inciting Keats' jealousy. Though the real life Fanny Brawne went on to marry and have children, she never sold Keats' love letters. They were sold after her death by her children.
 Paul Schneider as Charles Armitage Brown, Keats' best friend.
 Kerry Fox as Fanny's mother, a widow.
 Thomas Sangster as Samuel Brawne, Fanny's younger brother.
 Edie Martin as Toots, Fanny's younger sister.
 Antonia Campbell-Hughes as Abigail O'Donaghue Brown, housemaid and mother of Charles Brown's child.
 Claudie Blakley as Mrs Dilke
 Gerard Monaco as Charles Dilke
 Olly Alexander as Tom Keats, Keats' brother
 Samuel Roukin as John Hamilton Reynolds
 Amanda Hale as Reynolds' Sister
 Jonathan Aris as Leigh Hunt
 Samuel Barnett as Joseph Severn

Production
In addition to "Bright Star" several other poems are recited in the film, including "La Belle Dame sans Merci" and "Ode to a Nightingale". Both Campion and Whishaw completed extensive research in preparation for the film. Many of the lines in the script are taken directly from Keats' letters. Whishaw, as well, learned how to write with a quill and ink during filming. The letters that Fanny Brawne receives from Keats in the film were actually written by Whishaw in his own hand.

Janet Patterson, who has worked with Campion for over 20 years, served as both costume designer and production designer for the film.

The Hyde House and Estate in Hyde, Bedfordshire, substituted for the Keats House in Hampstead. Campion decided that the Keats House (also known as Wentworth Place) was too small and "a little bit fusty". Some filming also took place at Elstree Studios.

Reception

Critical response
The film garnered positive reviews from critics. Review aggregator Rotten Tomatoes reports that 83% out of 175 critics gave the film a positive review, with an average score of 7.26/10. The website's critical consensus states, "Jane Campion's direction is as refined as her screenplay, and she gets the most out of her cast – especially Abbie Cornish – in this understated period drama." On Metacritic, the film has a weighted average score of 81 out of 100, based on 34 critics, indicating "universal acclaim".

Mary Colbert of SBS awarded the film five stars out of five. "If Campion intended to inspire an appreciation and rediscovery of Keats' poetry," she writes, "she has not only succeeded but herself created an artistic monument to his life, love, poetry and soul." Craig Mathieson stated in the same review that Bright Star is Jane Campion's "best work since The Piano, her epochal 1993 masterpiece." Roger Ebert gave the film three and a half stars out of four.

Poet and scholar Stanley Plumly, the author of Posthumous Keats: A Personal Biography, wrote of the film's writing and direction: "Jane Campion has understood the richly figurative in Keats' life without sacrificing the literal wealth of its texture. She has evoked the mystery of his genius without giving up the reality of its dailiness." In 2019, The Guardian added the film in its 100 best films of the 21st century list. In 2019, the BBC polled 368 film experts from 84 countries to name the 100 greatest films directed by women; Bright Star was voted at No. 54.

Box office
Bright Star grossed $3,110,560 at the box office in Australia. and a worldwide total of $14.4m.

Awards

Soundtrack
Lakeshore Records released the soundtrack for Bright Star digitally (iTunes and Amazon Digital) on 15 September 2009 and in stores on 13 October 2009. The film's soundtrack features original music by Mark Bradshaw with dialogue from the film voiced by Cornish and Whishaw.

Track listing
 "Negative Capability" – 3:55
 "La Belle Dame Sans Merci" – 2:28
 "Return" – 0:58
 "Human Orchestra" – 1:48
 "Convulsion" – 0:52
 "Bright Star" – 1:49
 "Letters" – 3:49
 "Yearning" – 2:24
 "Ode to a Nightingale" – 5:24

Book of Love Letters and Poems
A collection of Keats's love letters and selected poems was published in 2009 as a companion to the motion picture, entitled Bright Star: Love Letters and Poems of John Keats to Fanny Brawne. The 144-page book was published by Penguin and includes an introduction written by Campion.

Anecdotes

Composer Mark Bradshaw can be seen in the film as the conductor while the men choir performs the track Human Orchestra, which Bradshaw arranged from the third movement of the serenade for twelve winds and string bass by Wolfgang Amadeus Mozart.

Actor Ben Whishaw, who plays John Keats, met Bradshaw on set. In 2012, they entered into a civil partnership.

Notes

References

External links
 
 
 
 
 A chapter about John Keats, Fanny Brawne, and the poem "Bright Star" from Keats, the 1997 biography by Andrew Motion that inspired the film.

2009 films
2009 independent films
2009 romantic drama films
Films shot at Elstree Film Studios
Pathé films
BBC Film films
Australian biographical drama films
Films directed by Jane Campion
Films set in London
Films set in Rome
Films shot in England
British romantic drama films
British biographical drama films
Biographical films about poets
Keats, John
Australian romantic drama films
2000s English-language films
2000s British films